AD 3 is a year in the Gregorian calendar.

AD 3 or AD-3 may also refer to:

Salmson AD.3, an aircraft piston engines of the 1920s
Adaridi AD 3, a Finnish experimental aircraft of the 1920s
AD-3, the third production variant of the Douglas AD Skyraider aircraft
One of the experiments running on the Antiproton Decelerator
, a US Navy destroyer tender